Dorcasomus mirabilis is a species of beetle in the family Cerambycidae. It was described by Quentin and Villiers in 1970.

References

Dorcasominae
Beetles described in 1970